Pato Futsal, is a Brazilian futsal club from Pato Branco. Founded in 2010 it has won two Liga Futsal and one Taça Brasil de Futsal.

Club honours

National competitions
 Liga Futsal: 2018
 Taça Brasil de Futsal: 2018
 Liga Futsal: 2019

Regional competitions
 Liga Sul de Futsal: 2018

State competitions
 Chave Ouro: 2017
 Chave Prata (2): 2011, 2016
 Jogos Abertos do Paraná Divisão B: 2013

Current squad

References

External links
 Pato Futsal official website
 Pato Futsal LNF profile
 Pato Futsal in zerozero.pt

Futsal clubs established in 2010
2010 establishments in Brazil
Futsal clubs in Brazil
Sports teams in Paraná